Gangadevi, also known as Gangambika, was a 14th-century princess and Sanskrit-language poet of the Vijayanagara Empire of present-day India.

Life and work
Gangadevi was wife of Kumara Kampana, the son of the Vijayanagara king Bukka Raya I (c. 1360s-1370s).

Gangadevi chronicled the story of the victory of her husband over the Muslims in Madurai in the form of a poem. The title of the nine chapter poem was Madhura Vijayam, also known as Veerakamparaya Charitram. After the discovery of the documents, a Tamil version was published by Sri Krishnamacharya of Srirangam, and then Annamalai University published an English translation in 1950. In addition to writing, she also fought in battle with her husband and inspired other women.

She is believed to have been a Telugu princess. At the beginning of Madhura Vijayam, Gangadevi eulogizes several Sanskrit poets of the Telugu-speaking region, and particularly admires Tikkaya (identified with Tikkana, the author of Andhra Mahabharatam). This is considered to be a strong evidence of her Telugu ancestry.

Influence

Gangadevi is a key inspiration for Pampa Kampana, the protagonist of Salman Rushdie's novel Victory City.

References 

Sanskrit-language women poets
Sanskrit poets
Poets from Karnataka
Indian women poets
14th-century Indian women writers
14th-century Indian writers
Indian princesses
14th-century Indian poets
People of the Vijayanagara Empire
Women of the Vjayanagara Empire
Vijayanagara poets
Telugu people